Chazablanca is the third solo studio album by the English singer and multi-instrumentalist Chaz Jankel. It was originally released in 1983, on the label A&M.

Track listing

Personnel
Credits are adapted from the album's liner notes.
Chas Jankel – lead and background vocals; guitar; keyboards; percussion
Jamie Lane – drums; synthesizer
Kendal Stubbs – bass guitar; percussion
Neil Richmond – synthesizer programming
Janie Romer – backing vocals
Laura Weymouth – backing vocals
Production team
Philip Bagenal – engineer; mixing
Steven Stanley – engineer
Chaz Jankel – mixing
Mark Sayer-Wade – mixing
Paul Etienne – mixing
Aaron Chakraverty – mastering
Richard Haughton – photography
Peter Saville – typography

See also
List of albums released in 1983

References

External links

1983 albums
A&M Records albums
Chaz Jankel albums